The Zwanzig projection operator is a mathematical device used in statistical mechanics. It operates in the linear space of phase space functions and projects onto the linear subspace of "slow" phase space functions. It was introduced by Robert Zwanzig to derive a generic master equation. It is mostly used in this or similar context in a formal way to derive equations of motion for some "slow" collective variables.

Slow variables and scalar product
The Zwanzig projection operator operates on functions in the -dimensional phase space  of  point particles with coordinates  and momenta .
A special subset of these functions is an enumerable set of "slow variables" . The Zwanzig projection operator relies on these functions but does not tell how to find the slow variables of a given Hamiltonian .

where

denotes the microcanonical equilibrium distribution. "Fast" variables, by definition, are orthogonal to all functions  of  under this scalar product. This definition states that fluctuations of fast and slow variables are uncorrelated, and according to the ergodic hypothesis this also is true for time averages. The product of a slow and a fast variable is a fast variable.

The projection operator
Consider the continuous set of functions  with  constant.

A generic phase space function  decomposes according to
	
To get an expression for the slow part  of  take the scalar product with the slow function ,

This expression agrees with the expression given by Zwanzig, except that Zwanzig subsumes  in the slow variables. Functions of slow variables and in particular products of slow variables are slow variables. The space of slow variables thus is an algebra. The algebra in general is not closed under the Poisson bracket, including the Poisson bracket with the Hamiltonian.

Connection with Liouville and Master equation 
it allows to derive a master equation for the time dependent probability
distribution  of the slow variables (or Langevin equations for the slow variables themselves).

To sketch the typical steps, let 
denote the time-dependent probability distribution in phase space.
The phase space density  (as well as ) is a solution of the Liouville equation

The crucial step then is to write , 
and to project the Liouville equation onto the slow and
the fast subspace,

The latter equation finally gives an equation for 
where  denotes the equilibrium distribution of the slow variables.

Nonlinear Langevin equations
The starting point for the standard derivation of a Langevin equation is the identity , where  projects onto the fast subspace.
Consider discrete small time steps  with evolution operator , where  is the Liouville operator. The motivation is that  is a functional of slow variables and that  generates expressions which are fast variables at every time step. The expectation is that fast variables isolated in this way can be represented by some model data, for instance by a Gaussian white noise. Iteration gives

The last line can also be proved by induction. Assuming  and performing the limit  directly leads to the operator identity of Kawasaki

Here  is the fluctuating force (it only depends on fast variables).

Discrete set of functions, relation to the Mori projection operator
If these functions constitute a complete orthonormal function set then the projection operator simply reads

This leads to the Mori projection operator. However, the set of linear functions is not complete, and the orthogonal variables are not fast or random if nonlinearity in  comes into play.

See also 

 Mori-Zwanzig formalism

References 

Statistical mechanics